The Lotus 27 was a Formula Junior version of the Lotus 25 Formula One car for the 1963 Formula Junior season. Its body was aluminium monocoque with steel bulkheads. It was originally designed with fibreglass sides which led to flexing problems, leading to them being replaced with aluminium.

The Team Lotus cars were run by Ron Harris; and Peter Arundell won the 1963 British championship after the initial flexing problems were solved.

27
Formula Junior cars
Tasman Series cars